DIP Presents the Upsetter is a studio album by The Upsetters, released in 1975.

Track listing

Side one
"Enter the Dragon" – The Upsetters
"I Don't Mind" – Sam Carty
"Cane River Rock" – The Upsetters
"I Man Free" – King Burnett
"Jamaican Theme" – The Upsetters
"Time" – The Gladiators

Side two
"Jump It" – Leo Graham
"Live Is a Flower" – Sam Carty
"Have Some Fun" – The Gaylads
"Nature Man" – The Gaylads
"Dub a Pum Pum" – The Silvertones
"Fu Kung Man" – Linval Spencer (aka Linval Thompson)

The Upsetters albums
1975 albums
Albums produced by Lee "Scratch" Perry